Chesterfield Township (T9N R9W) is located in Macoupin County, Illinois, United States. As of the 2010 census, its population was 855 and it contained 380 housing units.

Geography

Demographics

Adjacent townships
 Western Mound Township (north)
 Bird Township (northeast)
 Polk Township (east)
 Hillyard Township (southeast)
 Shipman Township (south)
 Fidelity Township, Jersey County (southwest)
 Ruyle Township, Jersey County (west)
 Rockbridge Township, Greene County (northwest)

References

External links
City-data.com
Illinois State Archives

Townships in Macoupin County, Illinois
Townships in Illinois